The Northeastern Huskies represent Northeastern University in the Women's Hockey East Association during the 2017–18 NCAA Division I women's ice hockey season.

Off-Season

Kendall Coyne ('16) was named to the US National Women's Team for 2017-18.  She will relocate to the Tampa, FL area in September to train with the team for the 2018 Olympics.

Recruiting

Standings

Roster

2017–18 Huskies

2017-18 Schedule

|-
!colspan=12 style="background:black; color:red;"| Regular Season
 
 
 
 
 
 
 
 
 
 
 
 
 
 

|-
!colspan=12 style="background:black; color:red;"| WHEA Tournament

Awards and honors

References

Northeastern Huskies women's ice hockey seasons
Northeastern